Sanders Shiver (born February 14, 1955) is former American football player and coach. A fifth round draft choice out of Carson–Newman College—now known as Carson–Newman University—in 1976, he professionally played ten years as a linebacker in the National Football League (NFL) with the Baltimore Colts and Miami Dolphins. Shiver served as the head football coach at Bowie State University in Bowie, Maryland from 1989 to 1992, compiling a record of 15–24–1. Shiver was an assistant coach at Bowie State from 1986 to 1988 under Dave Dolch, before succeeding him as head coach in December 1988 when Dolch left to become the head football coach at Morningside College in Sioux City, Iowa.

Shiver currently works for the public school system of Prince George's County, Maryland, is married, and has four daughters.

Head coaching record

College

References

External links
 

1955 births
Living people
American football linebackers
Baltimore Colts players
Bowie State Bulldogs football coaches
Carson–Newman Eagles football players
Miami Dolphins players
People from Hopkins, South Carolina
Coaches of American football from South Carolina
Players of American football from South Carolina
African-American coaches of American football
African-American players of American football
20th-century African-American sportspeople
21st-century African-American sportspeople